Motu Iosefo Tony (born 29 May 1981) is a former New Zealand international rugby league footballer who played as a  in the 2000s and 2010s. He previously played in the NRL for the New Zealand Warriors and the Brisbane Broncos before playing in the Super League for the Castleford Tigers (Heritage № 815), Hull F.C. (with whom he won the 2005 Challenge Cup) and the Wakefield Trinity Wildcats, and in the RFL Championship for Whitehaven.

Background
Tony was born in Saleimoa, Samoa.

He attended De La Salle College where he played for the First XIII rugby league team. He played for the Marist Saints in the Auckland Rugby League competition before being signed by the New Zealand Warriors. He played for the Marist-Richmond Brothers in the 2000 Bartercard Cup and also toured Australia with the New Zealand Residents that year.

Professional playing career

National Rugby League
Tony made his professional début for the New Zealand Warriors in 2001. He went on to play 55 games for the club, including his appearance at five-eighth in the Warriors' 2002 NRL grand final loss to the Sydney Roosters. In 2004 he moved to the Brisbane Broncos but only played in three games for the club before leaving to play in the Super League. His spot in Brisbane was taken over by 17 year old Karmichael Hunt.

Super League
Tony initially played for English club Castleford. In 2005 he joined Hull F.C. Tony played  for Hull in the 2005 Challenge Cup Final, scoring a try in the victory against Leeds Rhinos. He was part of the New Zealand side that won the Gillette Tri-Nations in 2005, beating Australia in the final 24–0. 
Hull reached the 2006 Super League Grand final to be contested against St Helens R.F.C. and Tony played on the wing in his side's 4-26 loss.
He played in 109 games for Hull before crossing codes to play for National 2 (North) Rugby Union club Hull RUFC. Following the end of the Rugby union season Tony signed for Whitehaven. Tony had represented the New Zealand national rugby league team 18 times between 2001 and 2006.

In 2008 he chose to represent Samoa and was named in the Samoa training squad for the 2008 Rugby League World Cup but withdrew due to injury.
In July 2010 it was announced that Tony had signed for a 1-month trial with Championship union side Nottingham Rugby.

On 28 October 2010, Super League club Wakefield Trinity announced the signing of Tony. On 12 June 2010, Tony made his début for Trinity at fullback in their 13–10 home victory over Huddersfield.

References

External links
Hull profile
Kiwi profile
Castleford Tigers profile
Kiwi star Tony to play for Samoa
Wildcats Capture Kiwi International

1981 births
Living people
Brisbane Broncos players
Castleford Tigers players
Hull F.C. players
Marist Richmond Brothers players
Marist Saints players
New Zealand national rugby league team players
New Zealand people of Niuean descent
New Zealand sportspeople of Samoan descent
New Zealand rugby league players
New Zealand rugby union players
New Zealand Warriors players
People educated at De La Salle College, Māngere East
Rugby league five-eighths
Rugby league fullbacks
Rugby league wingers
Sportspeople from Apia
Wakefield Trinity players
Whitehaven R.L.F.C. players